Sampson Strong (c.1550–1611) was a Dutch portrait painter. He was a resident portrait painter at Oxford University and painted founder's portraits for All Souls, New and Christ Church colleges. He was followed by Richard Greenway. He was employed by the governors of Christ's Hospital, Abingdon to decorate the hall with portraits of founders, benefactors and former governors.

Gallery

References

1550s births
1611 deaths
Dutch painters
Dutch male painters
Dutch portrait painters